Aaron David Rubin (born June 30, 1976) is an American linguistics researcher. He is currently the Malvin and Lea Bank Professor of Classics & Ancient Mediterranean Studies, Jewish Studies, and Linguistics at Penn State University, where he has taught since 2004. His main area of study is the Semitic language family, focusing on Hebrew, Arabic, Aramaic, and the modern languages of Southern Arabia, especially Mehri and Jibbali. He has also worked extensively on non-Semitic Jewish languages, as well as on Hebrew and Jewish manuscripts. At Penn State, he has taught numerous language courses (on Hebrew, Arabic, Aramaic, and Yiddish), as well lecture courses on the Bible, Jewish and Ancient Near Eastern literature, and the history of writing systems. He received a Guggenheim Fellowship in 2016.

Education
Rubin received his B.A. and M.A. degrees in linguistics from the University of Pennsylvania (1998, 1999), and Ph.D. degree in Near Eastern languages and civilizations from Harvard University (2004). His M.A. thesis was titled "An Introduction to the Comparative Grammar of Egyptian and Semitic", and his PhD dissertation was titled "Studies in Semitic Grammaticalization".

Career

Work on Modern South Arabian
Some of Rubin's most significant contributions to the field of Semitics have been focused on the Modern South Arabian languages of Oman. His books, The Mehri Language of Oman (2010) and The Jibbali (Shaḥri) Language of Oman: Grammar and Texts (2014), were both the first grammars of those languages. The latter volume also included many texts, which were the first Jibbali texts published in over a century. His 2010 grammar of Mehri has been superseded by his Omani Mehri: A New Grammar with Texts (2018), which also includes over 100 texts. In addition to his grammars, he has published numerous articles on the Modern South Arabian languages.

Work on Jewish languages
In 2016, Rubin co-edited (with Lily Kahn) the Handbook of Jewish Languages. It includes descriptions of around 25 different Jewish languages, some of which (such as Israeli Amharic, Jewish Russian, and Jewish Malayalam) had been the subject of little to no previously published scholarship. Rubin's contribution on Judeo-Italian is the most comprehensive reference available on that language. Rubin and Kahn also wrote Jewish Languages from A to Z (2020), including chapters on more than 40 different languages, and aimed at a more general audience. Rubin has also published the first work on Judeo-Urdu, namely, an edition and study of a 19th-century Hebrew–Urdu glossary, all written in Hebrew characters.

Publications

Books written
Studies in Semitic Grammaticalization (2005)
Samuel David Luzzatto, Prolegomena to a Grammar of the Hebrew Language (2005)
The Mehri Language of Oman (2010)
A Brief Introduction to the Semitic Languages (2010)
The Jibbali (Shaḥri) Language of Oman: Grammar and Texts (2014)
A Unique Hebrew Glossary from India: An Analysis of Judeo-Urdu (2016)
Omani Mehri: A New Grammar with Texts (2018)
Jewish Languages from A to Z (with Lily Kahn, 2021)

Books edited
Studies in Classical Linguistics in Honor of Philip Baldi (with B. Richard Page, 2010)
Encyclopedia of Hebrew Language and Linguistics (with Geoffrey Khan, et al., 2013)
Epigraphy, Philology, and the Hebrew Bible (with Jeremy Hutton, 2015)
Handbook of Jewish Languages (with Lily Kahn, 2016) (revised and updated paperback edition published in 2017)

References

1976 births
Living people
Pennsylvania State University faculty
University of Pennsylvania alumni
Harvard University alumni
Linguists from the United States